Vinci Bank is a submarine bank in the Weddell Sea. It is named after Leonardo da Vinci (1452–1519), world-renowned scientist and artist. The name was proposed by Dr. Heinrich Hinze, Alfred Wegener Institute for Polar and Marine Research, Bremerhaven, Germany. Name approved 6/97 (ACUF 271).

References

Undersea banks of the Southern Ocean